Leptocerus is a genus of long-horned caddisflies in the family Leptoceridae. There are more than 140 described species in Leptocerus.

See also
 List of Leptocerus species

References

Further reading

External links

 

Trichoptera genera
Articles created by Qbugbot
Integripalpia